Robert Symonds (December 1, 1926 – August 23, 2007) was an American actor. He was the associate director of the Repertory Theater of Lincoln Center from 1965 through 1972.

Career
His stage credits with the Lincoln Center include productions of The Caucasian Chalk Circle, Cyrano de Bergerac, The Miser, Twelfth Night, and A Streetcar Named Desire. His motion picture credits include The Exorcist (1973, as Dr. Taney), Linda Lovelace for President (1975), Gray Lady Down (1978), ...And Justice for All (1979), Superstition, The Ice Pirates (1984), Crimewave (1985), Rumpelstiltskin (1987), Mandroid (1993), Primary Colors (1998), Inferno (1999) and Catch Me If You Can (2002).

On television, Symonds played Benjamin Franklin in the 1976 PBS mini-series The Adams Chronicles and the recurring role of Dr. Jonas Edwards on Dynasty from 1982 to 1987, and guest-starred on many series, including The Rockford Files, M*A*S*H, Benson, Cheers, Quincy, M.E., Star Trek: Deep Space Nine (as a Bajoran in the episode "Accession"), ER, Alias, and Cold Case (his last role in the episode "Static") and as Robert E. Lee in the 1982 miniseries The Blue and the Grey.  In the early 1970s, Symonds created the role of psycho stalker Will Watts on the CBS soap opera Where the Heart Is. He also starred in an episode of Cheers called " Take My Shirt...Please".

Personal life
Symonds was born in Bristow, Oklahoma, the son of Nellie (née Barry) and Walter Stout Symonds. He married Elizabeth Janel Kaderli in 1952 and had three children; Victoria, Barry, and Rebecca. He and Janel divorced in 1969.  He was married to actress Priscilla Pointer from 1980 until his death and was the step-father of actress Amy Irving and her siblings, David and Katie. He was the father of Vicki Morrison, Barry Symonds, and Becca Wooldridge.

He died on the morning of August 23, 2007, aged 80, from complications of prostate cancer.

Filmography

References

External links
 

1926 births
2007 deaths
American male film actors
American male soap opera actors
American male television actors
Male actors from Oklahoma
People from Bristow, Oklahoma
Deaths from prostate cancer
Deaths from cancer in California
20th-century American male actors